Humayun Kabir Chowdhury is a Jatiya Party (Ershad) politician and the former Member of Parliament of Naogaon-2.

Career
Chowdhury was elected to parliament from Naogaon-2 as a Jatiya Party candidate in 1986.

References

Jatiya Party politicians
Living people
3rd Jatiya Sangsad members
Year of birth missing (living people)
People from Naogaon District